The River Kings is a 1991 Australian mini series based on the novels The River Kings (1966) and Conquest of the River (1970) by Max Fatchen. It had a budget of $3.5 million. The paddle vessel PV Amphibious starred in the series as the Lazy Jane.

Plot
During the 1921 Mallee drought, sixteen-year-old Shawn Hoffner leaves behind farm life to find work to support his family. He finds work on a River Murray steamboat.

Home media
The series has been published in Australia by Beyond Home Entertainment on DVD: format 4:3; total running time 191 minutes.

References

External links
The River Kings at IMDb

Television shows based on Australian novels
1991 Australian television series debuts
1991 Australian television series endings
1991 television films
1991 films
Films directed by Donald Crombie